Josh Robert Thompson (born March 11, 1975) is an American actor, comedian, and impressionist. He is best known for his work on The Late Late Show with Craig Ferguson, providing the voice of robot skeleton and Craig Ferguson's sidekick Geoff Peterson along with numerous characters and impersonations, as well as his celebrity impersonations on Family Guy and The Howard Stern Show. 

Thompson performs voice impressions of Morgan Freeman, Robert De Niro, Arnold Schwarzenegger,  Matthew McConaughey, George Lucas and Donald Trump. In The Kelly Clarkson Show, he currently serves as game announcer "God," using his Morgan Freeman impression. He has also performed a stand-up comedian, often touring alongside Ferguson. His live-action projects include a lead role in the 2014 romantic comedy Nowhere Girl, as well as a crowdfunded pilot episode called The Josh Robert Thompson Show.

Early life
Thompson grew up in Cleveland, Ohio, "raised by classic television." He would watch as actors became different characters and began to mimic them. At age eight, his grandmother bought him a Fisher-Price tape recorder that he used to create radio-style "shows", voicing the host and the guests. The following year, he performed on stage in Peter Pan at the Cleveland Play House.

During his junior year at Padua Franciscan High School, Thompson delivered one line for the school's production of Oklahoma! and walked off to laughter and applause. "Then someone backstage said, 'They're clapping for you. They love you.' After that, I was hooked." Thompson and some of his classmates got a video camera and began making feature-length and short films, and television-style shows. He graduated from Padua in 1993.

Thompson moved to Los Angeles a few years later and performed on local television and as a stand-up comic while working toward his degree in TV, Radio and Film Production at California State University, Fullerton. He uses his middle name professionally because a "Josh Thompson" was already registered with the Screen Actors Guild.

Career

Radio appearances
Thompson's Arnold Schwarzenegger impression first gained national attention during the 2003 California gubernatorial recall election. Posing as Schwarzenegger, Thompson phoned in to Fox News Channel's morning program, Fox & Friends, fooling the hosts into believing (at least for a short while) that he was, in fact, Schwarzenegger.

Thompson's Fox News prank caught the attention of The Howard Stern Show, and the impression—dubbed "Fake Arnold" by the show's producers—soon became a mainstay on the program. At around the same time, Thompson also made a number of appearances on the Conway and Steckler and Conway and Whitman radio shows in Los Angeles (KLSX), and 96fm's Breakfast show in Perth, Western Australia, where he voiced a number of characters, including Fake Arnold, Robert De Niro, Sylvester Stallone, Michael Jackson, and Bill Cosby.

The Howard Stern Show
In April 2005, Thompson's "Fake Arnold" character proposed a fictitious plan to "blow up the moon". Fake Arnold's phony agenda managed to dupe MSNBC's Joe Scarborough, who appeared soon after on his television program, publicly lambasting the Governor for his alleged plan. Ten days later, after learning that the entire moon destruction scenario was a hoax, Scarborough apologized on-air for his erroneous comments.

On January 10, 2006, one day after Stern's show debuted on Sirius Satellite Radio, Thompson fooled Star Trek actor George Takei into believing he was actually speaking with Governor Schwarzenegger. Several minutes after the phone call with Fake Arnold ended, Takei was finally let in on the joke. One year later, the Takei prank was ranked sixth out of the Top 10 best moments from the show in 2006; it was also named as a top moment in the ten-year satellite tenure of the program.

Thompson has made several uncredited appearances in the show doing voice impressions like "Fake Arnold". His last appearance was in 2011. More recent impressions on Stern's show are done by another impersonator who also does many of the same voices as Josh.

Television work

The Late Late Show with Craig Ferguson

In February 2007, Thompson made his first on-camera television appearance as Governor Schwarzenegger on The Late Late Show with Craig Ferguson on CBS. He became a regular performer on the show, making appearances as Robert De Niro, "Frat Guy", Brian Deese, and Levi Johnston, and as the voice of Morgan Freeman.

Starting on April 20, 2010, Thompson voiced Ferguson's robot skeleton sidekick Geoff Peterson, originally using pre-recorded clips of various reactions to the host's cues. Thompson tweeted his "recipe" for Geoff's voice in September: "1 part Snagglepuss. 1 part Vincent Price. 2 parts George Takei." On May 16, 2011, Thompson performed Geoff as a show guest; in a later skit spoofing the show's opening broadcast, Thompson portrayed Peterson as a living sidekick who suggested that Ferguson could reanimate his skeleton should something befall him while skydiving. Beginning June 29, 2011, Thompson voiced and performed Geoff live for nearly every episode, both in-studio and in such locations as Paris, France.

Once Thompson began voicing Geoff Peterson live, he incorporated several of his own impressions into the character's repertoire. He has performed his Morgan Freeman impression for Freeman during the actor's appearances. In June 2011, Geoff asked Freeman, "Would you like to hear my Morgan Freeman voice?" and "What would you like to say to yourself?". Freeman gave the impression a thumbs-up and called it "outstanding".

In 2014, Thompson took over as the voice and operator of Sandra Peterson, the remote-controlled rhinoceros head that hangs over the fireplace. The character was originated by actress Dana DeLorenzo.

Craig Ferguson told Larry King Now in 2014 that he and Thompson would continue to work together after leaving The Late Late Show in December. In the interview, Ferguson called Thompson a "comedic genius".

Following the end of the program in 2014, Thompson returned to the show a year later in March 2015 where he made his television stand-up debut, in the episode where fellow Ohio native Drew Carey served as guest host.

The Josh Robert Thompson Show 
Using his online presence in August 2015, Thompson created an Indiegogo campaign that would help fund the post production costs of his pilot episode. In three days, Thompson's online following helped successfully fund the post production costs raising $51,613 (US) passing its original $25,000 goal.

During post production, the audio mixing was completed at Skywalker Ranch, where Ben Burtt overlooked some of the process and found Thompson's George Lucas sketch funny. Ben Burtt later complimented Thompson saying that Lucas himself would love his show and his characters.

On April 9, 2018, Thompson uploaded his pilot to various social media platforms to help gain traction, including Twitter, Instagram, and Periscope.

Voice acting
Since 2011, Thompson has voiced various characters on Family Guy, American Dad! and Skylanders Academy. While voicing a few sketches on Jimmy Kimmel Live!, Thompson also appeared on The Cleveland Show from 2011 until its cancellation in 2013. He has been the announcer of the Writers Guild of America Awards since 2017. Since 2019, Thompson has been currently voicing "God" with his Morgan Freeman impression on The Kelly Clarkson Show during the program's game impressions.

On-screen projects
Thompson began working on his first television series while still on The Late Late Show. The first installment, dubbed WJRT Television, starred Thompson alongside Dana DeLorenzo in a television news show parody. While some episodes were uploaded to Funny or Die, the series was not sold to a network.

In 2014, Thompson announced plans for an upcoming variety show, The Josh Robert Thompson Show. Its pilot episode was completed in 2015 through a crowdfunding campaign via Indiegogo.

Podcast
Thompson has also embarked on various podcasts throughout his career including Darren Carters “Pocket Party” and Brody Stevens “Festival of Friendship”. The most recent installment of his Joshin' Around podcast was picked up by iTunes in 2016, consisting of Thompson alone improvising all material.

Film
Thompson has starred as narrator in Yogi Bear and Scary Movie 5, with on-camera appearances as lead character in the 2014 film, Nowhere Girl, and a supporting role as a priest in the 2017 film, Revelator. He was also featured in The Angry Birds Movie, voicing two characters, and voiced a Construction Foreman in the 2017 film The Nut Job 2: Nutty by Nature.

Other work
In 2010, Thompson appeared in advertisements for More Than insurance, doing his Morgan Freeman impression. In the advertisement, Thompson's character is named More Than Freeman.

Web Series

In 2018, Thompson starred in a new web series called “F#cking 40”, a series about the Middle Ages. Thompson stars alongside writer and director Bill Caco, Jeff Pride and Justin Johnson. F#cking 40 won “Best Web Series” at the FirstGlance Film Festival in Philadelphia.

Original characters
Thompson's original creations include televangelist the Rev. Apostle BG; Gay Cabaret singer, Robin Sooper; Gary the Ogre; and Snorky Lopez, a Mexican raccoon.

Filmography

Television

Film

Video games

Music
 Austrian Death Machine - Arnold Schwarzenegger (voice) on 2009 album Double Brutal

Web
 Movie Fights - Himself (Episode 108 - What Iconic Horror Villains Should Face Off in Their Own Movie?)

References

External links

1975 births
Living people
American impressionists (entertainers)
American male comedians
American male television actors
American male video game actors
American male voice actors
Male actors from Cleveland
21st-century American male actors
21st-century American comedians